Tom Peeters (born 25 September 1978 in Belgium) is a Belgian retired footballer who is last known to have played for Pyrsos Grevena in Greece.

Career

Peeters started his senior career with Beerschot A.C. In 2000, he signed for Sunderland A.F.C. in the English Football League First Division, where he made one appearance and scored no goals. After that, he played for Belgian clubs Royal Antwerp, K.V. Mechelen, K.S.V. Roeselare, and F.C.V. Dender E.H., and Greek clubs Apollon Pontou and Pyrsos Grevena before retiring.

References

External links 

 Forgotten Black Cats: Tom Peeter
 SCHUIP OP DE MOND 
 "Nu bewijzen dat we ook uit punten kunnen pakken" 
 Voor Tom Peeters is de komst van Johan Boskamp bij Dender een hemels geschenk 
 Peeters heeft basisstek beet 
 "In België kreeg ik het predikaat van 'lange lompe' mee" 
 Tom Peeters rekent op een nieuwe kans

Association football midfielders
Belgian expatriate footballers
Sunderland A.F.C. players
Expatriate footballers in England
Expatriate footballers in Greece
Belgian expatriate sportspeople in England
Belgian expatriate sportspeople in Greece
Beerschot A.C. players
K.V. Mechelen players
K.S.V. Roeselare players
F.C.V. Dender E.H. players
Apollon Pontou FC players
Pyrsos Grevena F.C. players
Belgian footballers
Living people
1978 births